Hans Erwin Hagedorn (30 January 1952 – 15 September 1972) was an East German serial killer who murdered three young boys from 1969 until 1971.

Murders
On 31 May 1969 Hagedorn killed two nine-year-old boys, Henry Specht and Mario Louis, in a forest in Eberswalde with a knife. The bodies were found two weeks later. Both victims died from deep cuts to the neck, one cut so severe that one of the children found two weeks later had his head severed as a result of the rotting of the corpse. Extensive investigations were commenced, with a psychological offender profile being assembled and the Ministry for State Security obtaining documents about the case of West German child murderer Jürgen Bartsch. However, first investigations were not successful.

More than two years later, on 7 October 1971, Hagedorn killed Ronald Winkler, a 12 -year-old boy, in the same area and in the same way he had killed his first two victims. Shortly afterwards the decisive clue came from a boy who reported to have been sexually harassed in the year before the first murders took place. Erwin Hagedorn was arrested on 12 November 1971 and immediately confessed to the murders. East Germany had abolished capital punishment for juvenile offenders in 1952, meaning that Hagedorn could only face execution for murder he committed in 1971, when he was an adult.

In May 1972, Hagedorn convicted of murder with aggravating circumstances and sentenced to death. An appeal for clemency was denied by Head of State Walter Ulbricht. The 20-year-old Hagedorn was executed by a single shot in the back of the neck on 15 September 1972. His body was cremated and buried in a secret place.

He was the last regular criminal executed in the German Democratic Republic, though executions for political-laden crimes continued until the abolition of capital punishment in the 1980s. The last execution is believed to be that of Werner Teske in 1981.

Hagedorn was shot by Hermann Lorenz, a Stasi officer who shot 29 people during his time as East Germany's executioner. During an interview, he said neither Hagedorn, nor any of the other 28 people he executed, cried out or resisted as they were escorted to the death chamber.

See also
 List of German serial killers
 Capital punishment in Germany

Documentary 

Die großen Kriminalfälle: Tod einer Bestie – Der Fall Hagedorn, 2001 (German)

Literature 

 Werremeier, Friedhelm: Der Fall Heckenrose, Bertelsmann, München / Gütersloh / Wien 1975, .
 Brückweh, Kerstin: Mordlust. Serienmorde, Gewalt und Emotionen im 20. Jahrhundert. : Campus, Frankfurt am Main / New York, NY 2006, . 
 Mittmann, Wolfgang: „Tatzeit. Große Fälle der deutschen Volkspolizei. Band 1 und 2“, Das Neue Berlin, Berlin 2000, S. 445–508, .

References

1952 births
1972 deaths
20th-century German criminals
Criminals from Brandenburg
Executed East German people
Executed German serial killers
Executed people from Brandenburg
German murderers of children
German people convicted of child sexual abuse
German rapists
Male serial killers
Murder committed by minors
People convicted of murder by Germany
People executed by East Germany by firearm
People from Eberswalde
Violence against men in Europe